Maria das Neves Ceita Baptista de Sousa (born 1958) served as the 11th prime minister of São Tomé and Príncipe. She was a key figure in the Movement for the Liberation of São Tomé and Príncipe-Social Democratic Party (MLSTP-PSD) and became the first woman head of government in the country.

Career

Maria das Neves received education as an economist in Cuba with specialization in public finances. Before becoming head of government, Maria das Neves worked as a civil servant in the Ministry of Finance, in the World Bank and the UN Children's Fund (UNICEF). She married and when her two daughters had grown up, she held major government posts: Minister of Economics (1999–2001), Minister of Finance 2001/02 and Minister of Trade, Industry, and Tourism (2002).

In 2001 Fradique de Menezes was elected President with support of the Centre Party. But there was no clear majority in parliament, and the result was an unstable cohabitation with a number of short-lived cabinets headed by the opposition. A three party coalition was formed under the socialist Gabriel Costa and das Neves was member of the government.

Prime Minister of São Tomé and Príncipe

She held the post of Prime Minister from 7 October 2002 until 18 September 2004, and was the nation's first female head of government. President Fradique de Menezes appointed das Neves as Prime Minister after the three-party Government of National Unity led by Gabriel Costa collapsed following complaints from the army over recent promotions. The country was in a difficult situation, being heavily indebted and dependent on aid. There were disagreements and power struggles. When an oil agreement was signed with Nigeria, there was a military coup on 16 July 2003. The President was abroad and the army and mercenaries took action, arresting das Neves and other government officials. The coup leaders complained about corruption and said that the forthcoming oil revenues would not be distributed fairly. Following international pressure, an agreement was reached and Menezes reinstated after a week. das Neves
was hospitalized after suffering a mild heart attack. She resigned as Prime Minister, but accepted to continue when President Menezes reaffirmed his confidence in her.

President Menezes dismissed her from the post on 15 September 2004 and asked her party to choose a new Prime Minister, after allegations of corruption were brought against her and members of her government. She denied participating in any corrupt practices. Three days after her dismissal, a new government led by Damião Vaz d'Almeida was sworn in. Das Neves was elected an alternate to parliament and became an MP.

Afterwards

Maria das Neves is a member of the Council of Women World Leaders, an international network of current and former women presidents and prime ministers, whose mission is to mobilize the highest-level women leaders globally for collective action on issues of critical importance to women and equitable development.

References

Further reading

News articles
BBC news video from 14 October 2002
Afrol News article from September 22, 2004
Afrol News article from February 17, 2005

1958 births
21st-century women politicians
Women rulers in Africa
Government ministers of São Tomé and Príncipe
Living people
Movement for the Liberation of São Tomé and Príncipe/Social Democratic Party politicians
São Tomé and Príncipe economists
Women government ministers of São Tomé and Príncipe
Women prime ministers
20th-century women politicians
Female finance ministers
20th-century São Tomé and Príncipe politicians
21st-century São Tomé and Príncipe politicians